Dušan Martinović (born 22 December 1987) is a Serbian retired football midfielder who most recently played for FK Radnik Bijeljina.

Career
He has started in local club in his hometown, and later he moved to OFK Beograd, where he passed through youth teams. After his youth career, he played for Jedinstvo Paraćin and Palilulac Beograd in the third level football leagues in Serbia. Then he moved to Kolubara.

Kolubara
Martinović played for Kolubara in first part of season 2008–09. He made 16 appearances, and scored 1 goal.

Napredak Kruševac
In 2009, he played for Napredak Kruševac in Jelen SuperLiga, but second part on season 2008–09 he was on loan from Kolubara. For Napredak, he played 29 times and scored two goals.

Borac Čačak
In second half of season 2009–10 he played for 10 times.

In season 2010–11, he played 5 matches, and then, he injured his ligaments and missed the rest of season.

In season 2011–12, he played just 8 times. Borac was relegated to Serbian First League.

In 2012–13, Martinović was one of the best and most important players for Borac Čačak. After the end of season, he was on trial at Partizan, but not signed.

For first half of season, he made 11 appearances. Then, he left the club.

Jagodina
In a winter break off-season 2013–14, he signed with Jagodina.

Career statistics

Statistics accurate as of 12 May 2016

References

External links
 Stats at utakmica.rs

1987 births
Living people
Sportspeople from Šabac
Association football midfielders
Serbian footballers
FK Palilulac Beograd players
FK Kolubara players
FK Napredak Kruševac players
FK Borac Čačak players
FK Jagodina players
FK Radnik Bijeljina players
Premier League of Bosnia and Herzegovina players
Serbian First League players
Serbian SuperLiga players
Expatriate footballers in Hong Kong
TSW Pegasus FC players